The Carolina Queens are a women's American football team based out of Charlotte, North Carolina playing in the Independent Women's Football League and owned by Ebony Kimbrough. Home games are played on the campus of Hopewell High School.

From 2005–2007, the Queens were part of the Women's Professional Football League.

Season-by-season 

|-
| colspan="6" align="center" | Carolina Queens (WPFL)
|-
|2005 || 0 || 6 || 0 || 4th National North || --
|-
|2006 || 2 || 6 || 0 || 3rd National North || --
|-
|2007 || 1 || 6 || 0 || 3rd National North || --
|-
| colspan="6" align="center" | Carolina Queens (IWFL)
|-
|2008 || 4 || 4 || 0 || 2nd IWFL2 Southern South Atlantic || --
|-
|2009 || 7 || 2 || 0 || 1st IWFL2 || Lost IWFL2 League Quarterfinal (Carolina Phoenix)
|-
|2010 || 1 || 7 || 0 || 6th IWFL2 Eastern Southeast || --
|-
|2012 || 6 || 1 || 0 || Affiliate Team || Won Tier III Bowl (Colorado)
|-
|2013 || 5 || 4 || 0 || Affiliate Team || Won Tier III Bowl (San Antonio)
|-
|2014 || 6 || 3 || 0 || 2nd Eastern South Atlantic || Won Legacy Bowl (Minnesota)
|-
|2015 || 7 || 3 || 0 || 2nd Eastern South Atlantic || Won Eastern Conference Quarterfinal (Toledo)Lost Eastern Conference Semifinal (Carolina Phoenix)
|-
|2016 || 4 || 4 || 0 || 4th Eastern Atlantic || --
|-
!Totals || 43 || 46 || 0
|colspan="2"|(including playoffs)

Season schedules

2009

** = Won by forfeit

2010

References

The Carolina Queens

Independent Women's Football League
Sports teams in Charlotte, North Carolina
2005 establishments in North Carolina
American football teams established in 2005
Women's sports in North Carolina